ݪ (Unicode name: Arabic Letter Lam With Bar, code point U+076A) is an additional letter of the Arabic script, derived from lām (ل) with the addition of a bar. It is not used in the Arabic alphabet itself, but is used in Marwari to represent a retroflex lateral flap, and in Kalami to represent a voiceless lateral fricative).

Arabic letters